Conrad Creek is a stream in northern Bollinger County in the U.S. state of Missouri. It is a tributary of Whitewater River.

Conrad Creek has the name of George E. Conrad, a pioneer settler.

See also
List of rivers of Missouri

References

Rivers of Bollinger County, Missouri
Rivers of Missouri